WYDU (1160 AM) "Power House 1160" (formerly WTEL) is a radio station broadcasting a Religious format. Licensed to Red Springs, North Carolina, United States.  The station is currently owned by Sandra and Charles Cookman, through licensee WEDU Broadcasting Inc.

References

External links

YDU